Marie-Louise Coleiro Preca,  (born 7 December 1958) is a Maltese politician who served as President of Malta from 2014 to 2019. She has been president of Eurochild since 2019.

Previously, as a member of the Labour Party, Coleiro Preca was a Member of Parliament (MP) in the House of Representatives of Malta from 1998 to 2014. She served as the Minister for the Family and Social Solidarity from 2013 to 2014 under Prime Minister Joseph Muscat.

Early life and career
Born in Qormi, Coleiro Preca studied at the University of Malta where she graduated with a BA in Legal and Humanistic Studies (International Studies) and a notary public diploma.

Within the Labour Party, Coleiro Preca served within its executive. She was a member of the National Executive, the Assistant General Secretary, and as the General-Secretary. She was the only woman to have served in such a senior post of a Maltese political party. In addition to these posts, Coleiro Preca was also a member of the National Bureau of Socialist Youths (now the Labour Youth Forum), President of the Women's Section of the Party (1996-2001), founding member of the Ġużè Ellul Mercer Foundation and publisher of the Party's weekly newspaper Il-Ħelsien (now defunct).

She served as MP in the Maltese Parliament from 1998 to 2014. In the 2008 general election she was the first elected MP. As an Opposition MP Coleiro Preca served as Shadow Minister for Social Policy and as member of the Parliamentary Permanent Committee for Social Affairs beginning in 1998.

After Alfred Sant resigned as Leader of the Labour Party in 2008, Coleiro Preca unsuccessfully contested the Leadership election.

She served on the Maltese delegation to the Parliamentary Assembly of the Council of Europe from 2008 to 2013.

Following the end of her tenure as President of Malta in April 2019, Coleiro Preca, under the newly set up Office of the President Emeritus Coleiro Preca, will continue to serve as Chair for the Malta Foundation for the Wellbeing of Society, The Emanuele Cancer Research Foundation Malta, and of the Malta Trust Foundation. Moreover, Coleiro Preca was appointed as President of Eurochild, during Eurochild's General Assembly in Brussels.

Marie-Louise Coleiro Preca is Goodwill Ambassador for the United Nations Industrial Development Organisation (UNIDO), Champion for UNIDO's Third Industrial Development Decade for Africa (IDDAIII) and Special Ambassador for the United Nations World Tourism Organisation (UNWTO).

Moreover, Marie-Louise Coleiro Preca is a member of the Advisory Board of Women Political Leaders Global Forum, and leads its #Girl2Leader Campaign. She is also Chairperson of the Senior Advisory Board of the Blockchain Charity Foundation (BCF).

Presidency

On 1 March 2014, Coleiro Preca accepted the nomination for president. Succeeding George Abela, she was sworn in as President on 4 April 2014. Coleiro Preca is the youngest person to assume the office of President, sworn in at the age of 55, and is the second woman to hold the post after Agatha Barbara.

Soon after taking office, Coleiro Preca established a number of entities to nurture dialogue and to foster unity and a culture of positive peace among people.

The Malta Foundation for the Wellbeing of Society
The Foundation was founded on 25 June 2014. The Foundation, is a first of its kind in Malta. It aims to create a safe space for dialogue on social wellbeing, bridging popular wisdom with academic research. Through this process, the Foundation works towards enhancing human relationships. The Foundation operates through a consultation process, through a number of established, including; Children, Family, Community, Transculturalism, Interfaith, Persons with Disability, and conducts scientific research through the following Research Entities:
 National Institute for Childhood
 National Centre for Family Research
 National Observatory for Living with Dignity
 National Centre for Freedom from Addictions
 National Hub for Ethnobotanical Research

The Malta Trust Foundation
Coleiro Preca founded the Malta Trust Foundation on 14 May 2015. The aim of this Foundation is to encourage vulnerable young people, experiencing difficulties in life, such as unemployment, being at risk of poverty, or social exclusion, to improve their lives through education and training.

The President's Secret Garden
The President's Secret Garden provided a safe, interactive and creative space at The Presidential Private Gardens at Sant’ Anton Palace, giving Maltese children the opportunity to enhance their personality, express their opinions and feel empowered, through informal education. It aims to foster intergenerational dialogue as well as participation, inclusion and involvement of children with activities focusing on the following key areas, including self-expression, healthy eating, education, nurture, diversity, and art.

In the future, the Secret Garden concept will be exported to local schools and communities.

Arraiolos Group
In 2015, Coleiro Preca was the first Maltese President to join the Arraiolos Group of non-executive Presidents of the European Union. The Presidents meet annually to discuss current state of affairs and the future development of the European Union.  Coleiro Preca hosted the Arraiolos 2017 in Malta, and invited the Presidents of the states which were not members, to attend.

Empower
Seventeen women's organisations came together under one umbrella to secure a stronger voice in the debate for equality that will resonate among women and girls to inspire them to take on leadership roles.

Called Empower, this new platform was inspired by President Marie-Louise Coleiro Preca and was launched during the events marking the International Day of the Girl Child 2017.

The Emanuele Cancer Research Foundation Malta
This Foundation was set up with the purpose of reducing the impact and burden of cancer on the people of Malta, the Mediterranean Region and globally through supporting and promoting world class cancer research and development and education.

The Emanuele Cancer Research Foundation Malta (ECRFM) was founded by The President's Trust, the Fondazione Terzo Pilastro, Italia e Mediterraneo, and the University of Malta.

The ECRFM intends to facilitate excellence in cancer research and collaboration among scientific, clinical and psychosocial disciplines.  It will be taking the lead in multi-investigator and multi-disciplinary cancer research and will be the focal point for the introduction of clinical cancer trials.  The ECRFM will also provide information and education about cancer to the public and its representatives.  Through international research collaborations, the foundation shall be in a position to transform itself into a regional, Mediterranean cancer research hub.

The foundation is accommodated at the Biomedical Sciences Building at the University of Malta, supported by the Fondazione Terzo Pilastro, Italia e Mediterraneo.

The President said that "this new and most important venture will provide the much-needed research, development, and education about cancer, for the benefit of individuals, families, communities, and societies, across the Maltese Islands and the Mediterranean Region".

Honours and awards

Honours

National honours
 : Former Grand Master Grand Cross with Collar of the Order of Merit

Foreign honours
 : Grand Cross with Collar of the Order of Merit (20 January 2016)
 : Grand Cross of the Order of the Balkan Mountains (2 November 2016)
 : Member with Collar of the Order of Cyril and Methodius (5 February 2018)
 : Grand Cross Special Class of the Order of Merit of the Federal Republic of Germany, Special Class (29 April 2015)
 : Grand Cross with Collar of the Order of Merit of the Italian Republic (7 September 2017)
 : Knight Grand Cross with Collar of the Order of Merit (21 April 2015)
 : Grand Cross with Collar of the Order of Infante Henry (15 May 2018)
  Russian Imperial Family: Dame of the Imperial Order of Saint Anastasia, 1st Class (14 June 2017)
 : Grand Cross of the Order of the Republic (5 February 2019)
 : Grand Cross with Collar of the Order of Prince Yaroslav the Wise (15 May 2017)
 : Honorary Knight Grand Cross with Collar of the Order of St Michael and St George (26 November 2015)

Awards
 UN Women and Global Partnership Forum Agent of Change Award
Crans Montana Prix de la Fondation 2014
Student Wellbeing and Prevention of Violence Award from Flinders University, South Australia
WPL Award 2017 by Women Political Leaders Global Forum
Ukraine International Person of the Year 2017 – For Political and Social Activity
The ISESCO Gold Medal, for President Coleiro Preca's distinguished and tireless contribution, to the promotion of peace, in Malta, throughout the Mediterranean, and globally.
International Virdimura Award 2018
Premio Margutta – Sezione Empowerment

Honorary degrees
 Honorary Professor of Politics and International Studies, University of Warwick, 2015 
Honorary Doctor of Laws, University of Leicester, 2019

References

External links

 Official Website

1958 births
Living people
Labour Party (Malta) politicians
Members of the House of Representatives of Malta
Presidents of Malta
Female heads of state
Women presidents
United Nations officials
Maltese officials of the United Nations
Ambassadors of supra-national bodies
World Tourism Organization people
United Nations Industrial Development Organization people
Women's International League for Peace and Freedom people
Companions of Honour of the National Order of Merit (Malta)
Grand Crosses Special Class of the Order of Merit of the Federal Republic of Germany
Knights Grand Cross with Collar of the Order of Merit of the Italian Republic
Grand Collars of the Order of Prince Henry
Recipients of the Order of Prince Yaroslav the Wise, 1st class
Honorary Knights Grand Cross of the Order of St Michael and St George
University of Malta alumni
20th-century Maltese women politicians
20th-century Maltese politicians
21st-century Maltese women politicians
21st-century Maltese politicians
Maltese Roman Catholics
People from Qormi